Star Academy is a Dutch reality television talent show TV format that first aired in the Netherlands.

Format
There are many versions of the show, each country having its own slight variations, but the basic concept remains the same: contestants live in a boarding-school called "The Academy", managed by a director, and various teachers coach them in several artistic disciplines. The participants are filmed with cameras throughout the day and night (an idea borrowed from another of Endemol's major reality shows Big Brother). Once a week, the contestants have to face a prime time show, where they sing the song they've prepared during the week before, as well as recapping their trials and tribulations at The Academy from the past week. The live show will often feature special guest stars, with whom some of the contestants have the opportunity to sing. Based on the judges' verdicts and viewer voting, the weakest contestant is dropped. The eventual winner is awarded a record deal and usually some amount of money.

History

The public entity RTVE participated with Gestmusic, a Spanish branch of Endemol, in the development of a music program in 2001. The objective was to promote three musical careers and to find the new representative of Spain in the Eurovision Song Contest. After carrying out a series of auditions for thousands of people throughout Spain, on October 22, 2001, the first Operación Triunfo season began airing on Spanish television channel, La 1. A total of 16 contestants were candidates for the prize. Although production company Gestmusic created the format, Star Academy first premiered in France on October 20, 2001, two days before Operación Triunfo began airing in Spain.

Star Academy has reached markets as different as India, the Arab World and the United States, becoming the first Spanish format ever acquired by these countries. This show is similar to the Idols franchise, but different in that it also shows the contestants' lives together in the "Academy" where they are trained; American Idol shows nothing of the contestants' personalities or relationships with each other. Star Academy is in essence a singing competition, where the lowest vote-receiver each week must leave the show, ending finally when only one person remains.

In 2009, the Georgian local version of the show was cancelled mid-season as a result of their Academy building collapsing. Two on-site technical staff members died in the collapse in the early morning of 26 April 2009. Several contestants were brought to hospital following the disaster, but none of them were in danger. Rustavi 2 subsequently axed the series. 

In 2011, most Star Academy series outside of Africa and the Middle East were phased out in favor of another musical competition format from Endemol, The Voice. In Europe, many of the series were cancelled as a result of lower ratings and high production costs. In 2017, the series was revived in Spain after six years of absence and Russia after an absence of ten years. Although the Spanish series became a ratings success, the Russian revival became a ratings flop and was not renewed in 2018.

During the first months of the COVID-19 pandemic in 2020, Spain was the only country in the world that was producing a season of the show. The contestants were aware of the developments with regards to the pandemic, which led to the show being eventually paused for several months with the contestants sent home.

Star Academy around the world 
There were more than 30 franchises of Star Academy all around the world, with 103 winners. As of 2020, only the Spanish version is still in production. The French-Canadian adaptation (based on the French version) is expected to return in winter 2021.

 Franchise with a currently airing season
 Franchise awaiting confirmation
 Franchise with an unknown status
 Franchise with an upcoming season
 Franchise no longer in production

Star Academy hymns, official themes

Parodies of Star Academy 
Mexico: Aperración al Triunfo
France: StarLoose Academy, Vedette de Star
Greece: Super Star Academy

Special concerts of Star Academy

Eurobest

"Gala de los ganadores" (The winners gala)

Worldbest

See also
List of television show franchises
American Idol
Australian Idol
Making the Band

Notes and references
Notes:

 
Reality television series franchises
Singing talent shows
Banijay franchises